Münir Levent Mercan (born 10 December 2000) is a German footballer who plays as a midfielder for Süper Lig club Fatih Karagümrük.

Career
Mercan made his professional debut for Schalke 04 in the DFB-Pokal on 10 August 2019, coming on as a substitute in the 61st minute and scoring the fourth goal in the 73rd minute in a 5–0 away win against SV Drochtersen/Assel.

On 22 August 2019, he signed his first professional contract with Schalke until June 2023.

On 16 August 2021, he agreed to join Süper Lig club Fatih Karagümrük on a season-long loan. On 5 July 2022, the move was made permanent.

Personal life
Born in Germany, Mercan is of Turkish descent.

Career statistics

References

External links
 
 
 
 Levent Mercan (Münir Levent Mercan) at Bundesliga
 

2000 births
Living people
People from Recklinghausen
Sportspeople from Münster (region)
Footballers from North Rhine-Westphalia
German footballers
Germany youth international footballers
German people of Turkish descent
Association football midfielders
FC Schalke 04 players
Fatih Karagümrük S.K. footballers
Bundesliga players
Süper Lig players